The 1987 Walker Cup, the 31st Walker Cup Match, was played on 27 and 28 May 1987, on the Old course at Sunningdale Golf Club, Sunningdale, Berkshire, England. The event was won by the United States 16½ to 7½, their eighth successive win.

The match was one-sided. The United States led 12–4 after the second day foursomes, already having retained the cup. They won 4 and halved one of the 8 remaining singles for their biggest win since 18 holes matches were introduced in 1963.

Format
The format for play on Wednesday and Thursday was the same. There were four matches of foursomes in the morning and eight singles matches in the afternoon. In all, 24 matches were played.

Each of the 24 matches was worth one point in the larger team competition. If a match was all square after the 18th hole extra holes were not played. Rather, each side earned ½ a point toward their team total. The team that accumulated at least 12½ points won the competition. If the two teams were tied, the previous winner would retain the trophy.

Teams
Ten players for the United States and Great Britain & Ireland participated in the event plus one non-playing captain for each team.

Great Britain & Ireland
 & 
Captain:  Geoff Marks
 David Carrick
 David Curry
 Bobby Eggo
 Paul Girvan
 George Macgregor
 Paul Mayo
 John McHenry
 Colin Montgomerie
 Jeremy Robinson
 Graeme Shaw

United States

Captain: Fred Ridley
Buddy Alexander
Billy Andrade
Chris Kite
Bob Lewis
Bill Loeffler
Len Mattiace
Billy Mayfair
Brian Montgomery
Jay Sigel
Jim Sorenson

Wednesday's matches

Morning foursomes

Afternoon singles

Thursday's matches

Morning foursomes

Afternoon singles

References

Walker Cup
Golf tournaments in England
Walker Cup
Walker Cup
Walker Cup